Nancy Feber (born 5 February 1976) is a retired Belgian tennis player. As a junior player, she won four Grand Slam titles – one in singles and three in doubles. Feber won French Open twice, in 1992 and 1993, both times in doubles with Laurence Courtois. At the 1993 Wimbledon Championships, she triumphed in both singles and doubles.

Feber played as a professional tennis player from 1991 to 1998. Her best Grand Slam singles result is the third round of the 1994 Wimbledon Championships, the result she achieved in 1995 and 1996. In doubles, Feber reached three WTA Tour finals, one with Alexandra Fusai and two with Laurence Courtois, but won none. She also played for Belgium Fed Cup team, with the score of 2–2 in singles and 9–1 in doubles. Feber enjoyed success at the ITF Women's Circuit, winning three singles and eight doubles titles. Her highest rankings were No. 79 in singles and No. 46 in doubles. During her career, Feber defeated players such as Helena Suková, Irina Spîrlea, Jo Durie, Rita Grande and Meghann Shaughnessy.

WTA career finals

Doubles: 3 (3 runner-ups)

ITF finals

Singles: 7 (3–4)

Doubles: 13 (8–5)

Junior Grand Slam finals

Singles (1–0)

Doubles (3–0)

References

External links
 
 
 

1976 births
Belgian female tennis players
Flemish sportspeople
French Open junior champions
Living people
Wimbledon junior champions
Place of birth missing (living people)
Grand Slam (tennis) champions in girls' singles
Grand Slam (tennis) champions in girls' doubles
Sportspeople from Antwerp
20th-century Belgian women